Sean Payne may refer to:

 Cyanotic (band), member
 The Zutons, band member